United Nations Security Council resolution 862, adopted unanimously on 31 August 1993, after recalling resolutions 841 (1993), 861 (1993) and an agreement between the President of Haiti and the Commander-in-Chief of the Armed Forces of Haiti, the Council reaffirmed the international community's commitment to a solution in Haiti and discussed the establishment of a new police force in Haiti under a proposed United Nations Mission in Haiti (UNMIH).

The immediate dispatch of an advance team of no more than 30 personnel to assess requirements and prepare for the possible dispatch of both the civilian police and military assistance components of UNMIH. The mandate of the advance team would last for one month with the prospect of incorporating it into the UNMIH peacekeeping mission when established.

The Council awaited a further report by the Secretary-General Boutros Boutros-Ghali concerning the proposed establishment of UNMIH and its financial costs, time-frame, projected conclusion and co-ordination with the work of the Organization of American States, further requesting him to enter into a Status of Forces Agreement with the Government of Haiti to facilitate an early dispatch of UNMIH when the Council decided. The mission was formally established in Resolution 867.

See also
 History of Haiti
 List of United Nations Security Council Resolutions 801 to 900 (1993–1994)

References

External links
 
Text of the Resolution at undocs.org

 0862
1993 in Haiti
 0862
August 1993 events